In mathematics, the Castelnuovo–de Franchis theorem is a classical result on complex algebraic surfaces. Let X be such a surface, projective and non-singular, and let
ω1 and ω2
be two differentials of the first kind on X which are linearly independent but with wedge product 0. Then this data can be represented as a pullback of an algebraic curve: there is a non-singular algebraic curve C, a morphism

φ: X → C,

and differentials of the first kind ω′1 and ω′2 on C such that

φ*(ω′1) = ω1 and φ*(ω′2) = ω2.

This result is due to Guido Castelnuovo and Michele de Franchis (1875–1946).

The converse, that two such pullbacks would have wedge 0, is immediate.

See also
de Franchis theorem

References
.

Algebraic surfaces
Theorems in geometry